Pleasantville was a provincial electoral district for the House of Assembly of Newfoundland and Labrador, Canada. It existed from 1975 to 1996. The district was located in the north end of St. John's.

The riding was created for the 1975 election out of parts of St. John's East Extern and St. John's Centre. It was abolished before the 1996 election, mostly into Virginia Waters and St. John's East, with small parts going to Cape St. Francis and St. John's North.

Members of the House of Assembly
The district has elected the following Members of the House of Assembly:

Election results

References

External links 
Elections Newfoundland and Labrador Website
Website of the Newfoundland and Labrador House of Assembly

Newfoundland and Labrador provincial electoral districts
Politics of St. John's, Newfoundland and Labrador